The Veerse Meer (Lake Veere) is a lagoon in the southwest Netherlands in the province of Zeeland.

Description
The Veerse Meer was created as a flood control measure to regulate water levels in the surrounding polders, acting as a drainage basin for the surrounding polders until its excess waters can be discharged into the Eastern Scheldt. Its level are lowered in the winter to help drain the polders and maintained at a higher level in the summer for recreation.

History
Originally an outlet of the Scheldt called the Veerse Gat, it was first closed off from the Sheldt by the Zandkreekdam in 1960, and from the North Sea in 1961 by Veerse Gatdam, some of the first constructions of the Delta Works water management system. In 2004, the Katse Heule sluice was constructed in the Zanderkreekdam to allow saltwater to flow in from the Eastern Scheldt to improve water quality and return this former river mouth to its original brackish state.

Length and location
It is 22 km long, and 1,500 m wide in places. Lying between the old islands of Noord-Beveland, Zuid-Beveland and Walcheren, it is linked to the river Scheldt by the Zandkreekdam sluice, which allows this lagoon to have brackish water, slightly less salty than sea water. There are 13 small uninhabited islands in the lake. Some of its banks, underwater at high tide, have been made into nature reserves, while others are popular for water sports, such as sailing.

Gallery

References

Lagoons of Europe
Ramsar sites in the Netherlands
Bodies of water of the Netherlands
Landforms of Zeeland
Goes
Middelburg, Zeeland
Noord-Beveland
Veere
Walcheren
Zuid-Beveland